The TG4 Traditional Musician of the Year Award is given annually as part of Gradam Ceoil TG4. The award is to recognise the role of traditional Irish music and to ensure the task of  carrying forward the Irish tradition into the future.

The following is a list of the recipients of the award.
 1998 – Tommy Peoples, County Donegal
 1999 – Matt Molloy, County Roscommon
 2000 – Mary Bergin, Dublin
 2001 – Máire Ní Chathasaigh, County Cork
 2002 – Paddy Keenan, County Meath
 2003 – John Carty, County Roscomman & London
 2004 – Seán Keane, Dublin
 2005 – Jackie Daly, County Cork
 2006 – James Kelly, Dublin
 2007 – Liam O'Flynn, County Kildare
 2008 – Martin Hayes, County Clare
 2009 – Charlie Harris, County Luimnigh
 2010 – Seán McKiernan, County Galway & Boston
 2011 – Noel Hill, County Clare
 2012 – Bryan Rooney (musician), County Leitrim
 2013 – Dermot Byrne, County Donegal
 2014 – Harry Bradley, County Antrim
 2015 – Máirtín O'Connor, County Galway
 2016 – Kevin Burke, County Sligo
 2017 – Mairéad Ní Mhaonaigh, County Donegal
 2018 – Frankie Gavin, County Galway
 2019 – Catherine McEvoy, County Dublin
 2020 - Laoise Kelly, County Mayo

References

Traditional music
Irish music awards